is a Japanese manga series written and illustrated by Suu Minazuki. It was serialized in Hakusensha's seinen manga magazine Young Animal from October 2017 to March 2019, with its chapters collected in four tankōbon volumes.

Publication
Written and illustrated by Suu Minazuki, Dokunie Cooking was serialized in Hakusensha's seinen manga magazine Young Animal from October 13, 2017, to March 8, 2019. Hakusensha collected its chapters in four tankōbon volumes, released from May 29, 2018, to May 29, 2019.

Volume list

References

External links
 

Comedy anime and manga
Cooking in anime and manga
Fantasy anime and manga
Hakusensha manga
Seinen manga